In the United States, Statements on Auditing Standards provide guidance to external auditors on generally accepted auditing standards (abbreviated as GAAS) in regards to auditing a non-public company and issuing a report. They are promulgated by the Auditing Standards Board of the American Institute of Certified Public Accountants (AICPA), which holds all copyright on the Standards. They are commonly abbreviated as "SAS" followed by their respective number and title.

With the permission of the AICPA, the full text of Standards 1–101 has been posted on the website of the Digital Accounting Collection at the J.D. Williams Library of the University of Mississippi.  Links to these full-text records appear in the List of Statements of Auditing Standards below.

List of Statements of Auditing Standards

Pre-clarified Statements on Auditing Standards

Clarified Statements on Auditing Standards 
SAS No. 122,  Clarification and Recodification, contains the Preface to Codification of Statements on Auditing Standards, Principles Underlying an Audit Conducted in Accordance With Generally Accepted Auditing Standards, and 39 clarified SASs. This statement recodifies and supersedes all outstanding SASs through No. 121 except
 SAS No. 51, Reporting on Financial Statements Prepared for Use in Other Countries;
 SAS No. 59, The Auditor’s Consideration of an Entity’s Ability to Continue as a Going Concern, as amended; 
 SAS No. 65, The Auditor’s Consideration of the Internal Audit Function in an Audit of Financial Statements; 
 SAS No. 87, Restricting the Use of an Auditor’s Report; and
 the following clarified SASs that were issued to address practice issues timely and are already effective:
 SAS No. 117, Compliance Audits (issued December 2009); 
 SAS No. 118, Other Information in Documents Containing Audited Financial Statements (issued February 2010); 
 SAS No. 119, Supplementary Information in Relation to the Financial Statements as a Whole (issued February 2010);  and
 SAS No. 120, Required Supplementary Information (issued February 2010). 

SAS No. 122 also withdraws SAS No. 26, Association With Financial Statements, as amended.

The AICPA is the source of the most up-to-date information.

Codification of Statements on Auditing Standards
The American Institute of Certified Public Accountants began codifying the Statements on Auditing standards semiannually in 1976.  The Codification of Statements on Auditing Standards is generally issued in January, and the U.S. Auditing Standards is issued as part of the AICPA Professional Standards in June of each year. The current U.S. Auditing Standards are available at the AICPA's Web site.  Below is a list of older codifications from the Professional Standards.

See also

Auditing
AICPA
Statements of Financial Accounting Standards (USA)
International Standards on Auditing
Statements on auditing standards

Notes

References

Primary sources
 Auditing Standards, American Institute of Certified Public Accountants
 Auditing, Attestation, and Quality Control Standards Setting Activities: Operating Policies (2004), American Institute of Certified Public Accountants

Secondary sources
Mark S. Beasley, Joseph V. Carcello (2006), GAAS Guide 2007, CCH (publisher), 
Don M. Pallais, Cheryl Hartfield, Mary Lou Wurdack (2006); PPC's Guide to GAAS 2007, Practitioners Publishing Company, 
Michael J. Ramos (2006), Wiley Practitioner's Guide to GAAS 2007: Covering all SASs, SSAEs, SSARSs, and Interpretations, Wiley Publishing,

External links
AICPA official site
Summaries of Recently Issued Auditing and Attestation Standards (AICPA official site)
Exposure Drafts of Proposed Statements (AICPA official site)

Auditing in the United States
Auditing standards